Héctor Enrique Arce Zaconeta is a Bolivian lawyer, politician, who served as the Attorney General of Bolivia. He served as a Member of the Plurinational Legislative Assembly from 2010 to 2014, representing La Paz for the Movement for Socialism

Arce served as the President of the Chamber of Deputies from 22 January 2010 to 13 January 2012. Arce was unable to secure enough support from his party and lost reelection as President of the Chamber of Deputies to Rebeca Delgado by 25 votes.

References

Living people
1971 births
People from La Paz
Higher University of San Andrés alumni
Bolivian socialists
Movement for Socialism (Bolivia) politicians
Presidents of the Chamber of Deputies (Bolivia)
21st-century Bolivian politicians